Drakovouni (before 1927: Γλόγοβα - Glogova), Arcadia, Greece is a remote village in the municipality of Gortynia, Arcadia, Peloponnese, Greece. It is situated at 780 m elevation, on the slope of a mountain also called Drakovouni, 1,077 m elevation. It is 4 km west of Prasino, 9 km south of Filia and 37 km northwest of Tripoli. The few year-round residents are involved in agriculture. The village is known for the victorious battle of the guerrillas against the Nazis on April 20, 1944. Drakovouni has an elementary school, four churches, and three monasteries.

Historical population

See also
List of settlements in Arcadia

References

External links
http://arcadia.ceid.upatras.gr/arkadia/places/drakovouni.htm
http://www.inarcadia.gr/dd/drakovouni/img/drakov3-500.htm
GTP - Drakovouni

Populated places in Arcadia, Peloponnese